Riayatpur is a village in Nakodar in Jalandhar district of Punjab State, India. The village is administrated by Sarpanch an elected representative of the village.

See also
List of villages in India

References

External links 
 Tourism of Punjab
 Census of Punjab

Villages in Jalandhar district